The Arena Football League Ironman of the Year Award was given to the Arena Football League's best ironman (player playing both offense and defense) from the league's inception to 2012.

External links
AFL All-Time Awards

Arena Football League trophies and awards